Long Crag is a hill to the north of Rothbury in Northumberland, England. It lies within the Thrunton Woods, a Forestry Commission-owned area of forestry plantations.

Thrunton Woods have many marked trails provided by the Forestry Commission, and there are many routes to the summit.

Marilyns of England
Hills of Northumberland